The 1935 BYU Cougars football team was an American football team that represented Brigham Young University (BYU) as a member of the Rocky Mountain Conference (RMC) during the 1935 college football season. In their eighth season under head coach G. Ott Romney, the Cougars compiled an overall record of 4–4 with a mark of 3–4 against conference opponents, tied for sixth in the RMC, and were outscored by a total of 90 to 78.

Schedule

References

BYU
BYU Cougars football seasons
BYU Cougars football